GBA-5 (Nagar-II) is a constituency of Gilgit Baltistan Assembly which is currently represented by Javed Ali Manwa.

History 
Before 2015, the constituency was in the Hunza-Nagar District. In 2015, when Nagar was made a separate district, GBA-5 was made its constituency.

Members

Election results

2009
Mirza Hussain of PML(Q) became member of assembly by getting 1,890 votes.

2015
Rizwan Ali of Majlis-e-Wahdat-e-Muslimeen won this seat by getting 2,141 votes.

2020 
Javed Ali Manwa won his seat in the Gilgit Baltistan Assembly by securing 2570 votes.

References

Gilgit-Baltistan Legislative Assembly constituencies